The East Coast Main Line Route Utilisation Strategy (RUS), published by Network Rail in February 2008, was the seventh RUS.

RUSs are established by the Office of Rail Regulation (ORR) unless the latter objects within 60 days. A letter formally confirming establishment, but with some qualifications, was sent by ORR to NR in April 2008, and the RUS is included in NR's map as established.

The scope includes the whole of Strategic Route 8 - East Coast Main Line and Route 9 - North East Routes, and part of Route 5 (the Hitchin-Cambridge line). Not strictly within the scope but relevant to the service mix forming present and future utilisation of the RUS area are parts of Route 11 (to Sheffield and to Lincoln, and the diversionary joint GN/GE route from Peterborough to Doncaster via Lincoln), Route 10 (to Hull and to Bradford) and Route 24 (to Aberdeen).

As with other RUSs, the ECMLRUS took into account a number of responses, including the Office of Rail Regulation (ORR).

The routes and services covered by the RUS are varied in type. At the London end and in the vicinity of other major cities are inner suburban and metro-like services, which are vital commuter routes; across the RUS area there are cross-country and fast medium-distance passenger services, including inter-city services; there are long-distance (and in the British context very long distance) high-speed passenger services (LDHS) from London to a number of major cities in Scotland and northern England; and there are significant freight flows that use part of the area. A number of issues arise from the mix and intensity of these services, and the RUS addresses these in 10 groups.

Some issues are closely related to other RUSs: Scotland RUS (Edinburgh Waverley station and Portobello junction); Freight RUS.

Some issues were passed to later RUSs: Lancashire & Cumbria Yorkshire & Humber (Y&H RUS), the Network RUS, West Coast Main Line (WCML).

The RUS needs to be seen against existing contingent and prospective schemes, especially against the Thameslink project, which will see a step-change in services continuing through central London onto the network south of London. The timing of some interventions identified in the RUS are dependent on certain works in this programme being brought forward.

Groups of gaps and issues, with recommendations
A number of routes and services suffer from overcrowding of passengers in each usually 3-hour peak periods (mostly divided into a middle 'high' peak hour and two 'shoulder' peaks). In almost all cases these problems are foreseen, in the absence of interventions, to get worse owing to forecast growth in passenger traffic. These are simply referred to as "peak crowding" in the detail below.

London inner suburban services
The inner suburban services mainly comprise services from Welwyn Garden City on the main ECML route and from Hertford North  on the Hertford loop, branching off just south of Stevenage and immediately north of Alexandra Palace, to Kings Cross, or to Moorgate, branching off at Finsbury Park via the Northern City Line, in deep-level large-gauge tube tunnel south of Drayton Park. The Hertford loop is the main freight corridor at this end of the ECML, as it is cleared to W9, rather than W8.

Peak crowding
Crowding is acute, especially on the southern part of the Hertford loop; the recommendation is to lengthen all peak trains to 6 cars, and increase frequency to Moorgate to 10 trains per hour (tph) in both directions, subject to the implementation of Options A and B below. When rolling stock is replaced, attention should be given to the new stock's internal layout.

Increase off-peak service levels to 4tph
There is an aspiration for a minimum 4tph: this service level is recommended on Monday-Saturday; it may be combined with extension to 2tph via the Hertford Loop to Stevenage. On Monday-Friday between the peaks, increased revenue would cover the extra costs; at other times other benefits need to be taken into account.

London outer suburban services
Peak crowding
Peak crowding is set to get worse especially on the Cambridge line, and this will constrain the number of passengers unless capacity is increased. The main recommendation is to increase trains in the peak to 12 cars, requiring platform lengthening in several places, such as Royston and Letchworth with others delivered via the Thameslink programme, and other infrastructure changes, including a new island platform at Cambridge and power and stabling enhancements; some paths used by stopping trains north of Welwyn Garden City should be used for outer suburban services.

LDHS services
Peak crowding and off-peak demand
Generally lengthening of existing maximum formations is impracticable for a number of reasons, though the Intercity Express Programme (IEP) will provide an opportunity for greater capacity. The recommendation of the RUS is to increase the capacity of the LDHS lines to provide 8tph in the peak and 6tph off-peak (increased from 6 and 5 respectively), together with a repeating pattern every one or two hours; this will require very significant infrastructure changes as described below.

Aspiration to speed up journeys between London, Yorkshire, the North East and Scotland
The same infrastructure changes will allow LDHS services to run with a marginal acceleration in timing.

Irregular service intervals
Owing to the need to provide a reasonable level of services to secondary destinations on the ECML, long-distance services do not currently adhere to a regular clockface pattern. This will also be alleviated by the changes described above.

Direct services to destinations on and off main ECML
As outlined above, moving to a more regular pattern under enhanced capacity would safeguard and regularise services to the secondary destinations on the ECML. The ECMLRUS makes no particular recommendation on choice of services serving destination off the ECML, but leaves it to the normal industry practices to decide.

Anglo-Scottish service frequency
To be delivered as part of a package addressing several gaps, as described above.

Regional connectivity
This will be improved by the capacity enhancements and the opportunity provided to develop a more standard service pattern, possibly, in some cases, including direct services branching off the ECML (as happens now to Hull and to Sunderland).

ECML service pattern north between York and Edinburgh
In general the pattern of frequent but irregular services is largely dictated by the LDHS timetable (itself not on a standard pattern), the timing of cross-country services which are constrained by critical points off the ECML, and the needs of freight services.

South of Newcastle a critical physical section is the 2-track line between Northallerton and Newcastle. Timetable developments should endeavour to even out the gaps especially through Durham.

Various stakeholders, with potential access to funds, have aspirations for improved services and facilities, including new stations at East Linton (west of Dunbar) and Reston (north-west of Berwick).

Scotland
Dunbar station has a single platform, forcing northbound services stopping there to cross over to the other line; a second platform is recommended, which will allow additional trains to stop there and/or marginally improve journey times and performance, and in turn may help make other interventions more feasible. 
Though there is an aspiration for improved local services over the Scottish section, the RUS does not unequivocally recommend any of them, except for an hourly service from Dunbar to Edinburgh, extending an existing east–west service across Edinburgh. Options east of Edinburgh could be considered further by Transport Scotland.

South and West Yorkshire services
Peak crowding into Leeds (services via Wakefield Westgate)
There is some crowding on the route from Doncaster which includes 6 local stations and Wakefield Westgate. This issue was deferred to the Yorkshire and Humber RUS.

Links between regional centres
Leeds-Sheffield services can be provided via Wakefield or via Barnsley (outside the ECML RUS area). This issue was deferred to the Yorkshire and Humber RUS.

Funders' aspirations
South Yorkshire Passenger Transport Executive and West Yorkshire Passenger Transport Executive have various aspirations. Robin Hood Airport Sheffield Doncaster has an aspiration for an adjacent station, at Finningly on the Doncaster-Lincoln line. These schemes were all passed to the Yorkshire and Humber RUS.

Sheffield/Doncaster – London flows
The area can be reached from London via either the ECML or the Midland Main Line (MML). This issue was deferred to the Network RUS.

Tees Valley services
Peak crowding into Middlesbrough
There is such crowding on local trains; the recommendation is to lengthen the trains to 3 cars, by cascade of stock compatible with platform lengths.

Schemes remitted from North East RPA
Various schemes have been mooted for improving Tees valley services. The only recommendations endorsed by the RUS are improving line speeds in Tees Valley and Durham Coast lines as renewals become due, and possible occasional extra stops on the London-Sunderland service. Some projects might be delivered by the proposed Tees Valley Metro.

Tyneside local services
Peak crowding into Newcastle
The recommendation is to lengthen the trains to 3 cars, by cascade of suitable stock; platform lengths need to be taken into account.

Schemes remitted from North East RPA
The only recommendation endorsed by the RUS comprises minor improvements in linespeeds in Tyne Valley (Newcastle-Carlisle) lines as renewals become due.

Network flexibility
While there are specific geographically-based issues, as described above, there are types of existing constraints in the network capability which affect both those issues (directly) and efficiency of the network as a whole. Those more generic issues, within which there is a degree of overlap, comprise:
 Interaction between baseline capacity, options and any infrastructure enhancement schemes
 Ability of the system to recover from perturbations
 Balance of engineering and operations access
 Capability of diversionary routes and degraded main line operation

In turn those generic issues have a geographical impact which the RUS examines under the following line sections:
 The Hertford loop (two-track) As well as a busy commuter route in its own right this is an important diversionary route when the main line via Welwyn is closed. Infrastructure enhancements to increase the capacity of the line are justifiable.
 Four-track sections where lines are paired by direction without any diversionary routes The prime example given is Langley Junction to Hitchin Cambridge Junction. When signalling renewals are due, install bidirectional signalling allowing some level of service to be retained using a pair of lines during engineering/disruption.
 Hitchin Cambridge Junction – Peterborough (two- or three-track) The recommendation is for a later study to examine options for improvement.
 Werrington Junction (Peterborough) to Newark (and on to Doncaster) This is partly addressed by Option C below, but additional interventions should be examined.
 Newark to Doncaster Decoy Junctions (two-track) When signalling renewals are due, bi-directional signalling and associated works over this section should be introduced. Additionally, opportunities to enhance the Newark–Lincoln line in conjunction the Option C GN/GE line developments for diversions should be examined.
 Marshgate Junction (Doncaster) to Colton Junction (York) (two-track) When signalling renewals are due, bi-directional signalling and associated works over this section should be introduced. Additionally, opportunities to enhance the various diversionary routes should be examined.
 Marshgate Junction (Doncaster) to Whitehall Junction (Leeds) (two-track) When signalling renewals are due, bi-directional signalling and associated works over this section should be introduced. Additionally, opportunities to enhance the diversionary routes (via Hambleton Junction or Normanton) should be examined.
 York Holgate Junction to York Station (three-track) A fourth line and improvement of signalling arrangements are recommended to enable services from Leeds to remain segregated and access Platform 11 at York station.
 Northallerton to Ferryhill (south of Durham) (two-track) Opportunities to enhance the diversionary route (via Eaglescliffe and the Stillington branch) should be examined.
 Ferryhill (south of Durham) to Newcastle (two-track) Opportunities to enhance the diversionary route (via the Durham coast) should be examined. Less likely but not to be completely ruled out is the reinstatement of the mothballed Leamside line from Ferryhill to Pelaw junction (near the Tyne Dock branch).
 Newcastle to Edinburgh (two-track) For diversionary purposes, there needs to be a study to examine additional bi-directional signalling and associated works over this section, as against developing the alternative route via Carlisle (non-electrified) and the WCML.
 Use of ECML by traffic normally using other routes These include the Settle-Carlisle line, the WCML, the Durham Coast line, the Felistowe-Peterborough freight route (but not currently for W10 traffic as the southern ECML is not cleared). These should be examined by the Network or later regional RUSs as appropriate.

Freight RUS specific gaps
Port of Tyne – Tursdale Jn (Freight RUS Gap 12)
Recommended reinstatement of Boldon East curve

Hare Park Jn – South Kirkby Jn (Freight RUS Gap A)
Passed to Y&H RUS

Separation of east–west coal traffic to Eggborough/Drax/Ferrybridge power stations (Freight RUS Gap B)
Recommended remodelling of Joan Croft/Shaftholme junctions (avoiding coal freight use of the ECML to Hambleton Junction).

Peterborough Crescent Junction – Doncaster Loversall Carr Junction (Freight RUS Gap C)
See Option C below

W9/W10/W12 gauge aspirations
A programme of feasibility work had been developed.

Elimination of Class 92 OHLE restrictions
The introduction of IEP trains will trigger re-assessment of all electric traction requirements.

775m freight train operations
Recommended that during the development of renewals and enhancements the aspiration for such services be accommodated where possible.

Station gaps
Congestion relief at King's Cross Being addressed by the major redevelopment already envisaged.

Congestion relief at Finsbury Park This station suffers from severe congestion at peak times, and services are set to expand. Various options were to be examined, but would probably include re-instating of a disused platform (see Option A below).

Congestion relief at Peterborough To be taken forward in conjunction with partial remodelling (see Option C below).

Car parking There are particular problems at several inner suburban stations, Royston, Hertford North, Hatfield, Stevenage and Sunderland. More strategically increased parking at other locations may be developed to encourage access to the network.

Interchange with other transport modes No specific problems were identified, but interfaces with Transport for London services will need to be addressed at Kings Cross, Finsbury Park and Highbury & Islington.

Access to ECML from area around M25 This aspiration will need to be subject to a full multi-modal study.

Major infrastructure enhancements proposed

Conversion of goods line south of Alexandra Palace for passengers use (Option A)
This intervention underpins the other two options below, but is justifiable in its own right owing to speed, capacity and performance benefits. It involves adapting the Up (southbound) goods line between Alexandra Palace and Finsbury Park to passenger use, including additional platforms at Alexandra Palace, Hornsey and Harringay and a reopened platform at Finsbury Park. LDHS trains will achieve a three-minute speed increase, and southbound inner-suburban trains exiting from Hertford-loop can be totally segregated.

Works to enable up to 10 tph peak services on Hertford Loop to Moorgate (Option B)
In addition to Option A, additional power supplies (in any case to be provided by Thameslink) and signalling providing a four-minute headway in the tunnel from south of Finsbury Park area to Moorgate are both required. There would be some jeopardy to performance, but this is outweighed by the increased frequency.

Works to support extra long-distance and freight services (Option C)
These are by far the largest set of infrastructure interventions recommended by the RUS. They would allow up to 8 LDHS tph on ECML, with consequent other benefits, and  the forecast freight increase.

Upgrading of the GN/GE Joint Line from Peterborough to Doncaster, via Lincoln
This is mainly to provide for re-routed (to free up paths on ECML) and additional daytime freight traffic between these cities, but would also have the major benefit of providing a substantial diversionary route (though not electrified) in times of disruption or scheduled maintenance on the ECML. It is estimated to cost a quarter of the cost of four-tracking the corresponding stretch of the ECML, and remains significantly more cost-effective than alternatives comprising partial four-tracking of ECML plus shorter diversions for freight. Typical linespeed on the enhanced GN/GE route would be 75 miles per hour (mph) for intermodal (container) trains at W9/W10 gauge and 60 mph for heavy freight at RA10 availability. While the route is 10 miles longer than the equivalent stretch of the ECML, freight trains will run throughout at the appropriate linespeed, rather than having to be looped to allow passenger services to pass. The use of this route will also be compatible with the prospective W9/W10 cleared route from Felixstowe to Peterborough. Selectively linespeed may be increased for passenger trains on this route.

Additional platforms on the second Down (northbound) slow line at Hornsey and Harringay
Again this option allows segregation of Moorgate to Hertford Loop services to reflect the similar service in the southbound direction. North of Alexandra Palace the diverging northbound line to the Hertford Loop is already grade separated. The intervention also provides for flexibility for accommodating stopping and semi-fast services.

Grade separation of the northbound link from Hitchin to the Cambridge line
At present all northbound trains towards Cambridge have to cross the fast lines through Hitchin. The purpose of this proposal is to provide a flyover for this line to clear all the other lines north of Hitchin station on the main route (direction of Stevenage). Additionally, the junction of the merging (southbound) line from Cambridge would be remodelled to provide access to the fast line before reaching Hitchin station.

Partial remodelling of Peterborough and Doncaster layouts
There would be a requirement to alter the arrangements at both ends to facilitate the use of the alternative route. At Peterborough this will be combined with arrangements to provide better accommodation for other passenger services off the ECML.

Subsequent developments
In March 2009 Network Rail published its CP4 Delivery Plan 2009, including Enhancements programme: statement of scope, outputs
and milestones, confirming most of the recommended interventions. Specific projects, scheduled to cost about one billion pounds  in total, with their reference and page numbers in the document, are given below:
 03.04 Strategic Freight Network, In-fill gauge projects fund, pp21–22 (possibly includes London-Peterborough via Hertford Loop)
 09.00 King's Cross redevelopment, pp33–34
 11.00 Thameslink: programmes of work related to delivery of key outputs 0, 1 and 2, pp40–42
 12.00 IEP: related programmes of work on the East Coast and Great Western routes, pp43–44
 15.03 Platform extensions to 12-car capability, West Anglia outer suburban, pp58–59 (including new Cambridge island platform)
 18.01 Capacity relief to the ECML (GN/GE Joint Line), pp94–95
 18.02 Peterborough station area capacity enhancements, pp96–97
 18.03 Alexandra Palace to Finsbury Park 3rd Up line project, pp98–99
 18.04 Finsbury Park – Alexandra Palace 3rd Down line, pp100–101
 18.05 ECML level crossings, pp102–103
 18.06 Hitchin grade separation, pp104–105
 18.07 York Holgate Junction 4th line, p106
 18.08 Shaftholme Junction re-modelling, pp107–108
 18.09 Moorgate branch improvements project, p109
 18.10 Platform lengthening at Royston and Letchworth for longer First Capital Connect trains, p110
 19.00 Overhead line electrification refurbishment, pp111–112

References

Railway lines in the United Kingdom
Route Utilisation Strategy